Wiang Haeng is a district (amphoe) in the northern part of Chiang Mai province, northern Thailand.

History
The area of tambon Wiang was very far from Chiang Dao district center. The government separated Tambon Mueang Haeng and Piang Luang to create a minor district (king amphoe) on 5 May 1981. It was upgraded to a full district on 4 November 1993.

Wiang Haeng is believed to be the place where King Naresuan died in 1605 when he and his army went to war with Ava. At present, there are many archaeological sites that are believed to be built to commemorate him. But the place of his death remains a controversy in Thai history.

Geography
Neighboring districts are (from the northeast clockwise) Chiang Dao of Chiang Mai Province, Pai of Mae Hong Son province and Shan State of Myanmar.

The source of the Taeng River lies in the mountains of the Daen Lao Range in the north of the district.

Administration
The district is divided into three sub-districts (tambon), which are further subdivided into 26 villages (muban). There are no municipal (thesaban) areas, and three tambon administrative organizations (TAO).

References

External links
amphoe.com

Wiang Haeng